SS Tropic was a steamship operated by the White Star Line. Built in 1871 by shipbuilders Thos. Royden & Co, the 2,122 gross register ton vessel operated on the Liverpool to Calcutta run in 1871, and in 1872 began serving South American ports from Liverpool. In 1873, the ship was sold to Serra y Font, Bilbao, and renamed Federico. She was operated by the white star line. She served alongside her sister ship, RMS Asiatic.

History

SS Tropic was built by Thomas Royden and Sons in 1871. She and her sister SS Asiatic were bought by the White Star Line before their construction was finished. Even though Tropic was made to carry cargo, she also carried passengers. After serving on the Liverpool to Calcutta route for 1 year, her destination was changed to Callao, Peru on 5th November 1872. 

In February 1873, a lifeboat was found from the sinking barque James W. Elwell with three survivors. James W. Elwell was sailing from Liverpool to Valparaíso when she caught fire and blew up ten weeks prior. Fifteen crew had taken to the boat, but twelve of them had subsequently died. The survivors were taken back to Liverpool by SS Tropic. 

On 4 June 1873, she began her last voyage for the White Star Line. Along with her sister, she was sold, because the company was having financial difficulties after the loss of SS Atlantic. J. Serra y font, a Spanish shipping company, bought the two ships. Tropic was renamed Federico. 

In 1886, she was sold to another Spanish company. She served there until she was scrapped in 1894.

References

1871 ships
Ships built in Lancashire
Ships of the White Star Line
Passenger ships of the United Kingdom
Steamships of the United Kingdom
Passenger ships of Spain
Steamships of Spain